is a series of fantasy role-playing video games developed by Camelot Software Planning and published by Nintendo. Golden Sun follows the story of a group of magically-attuned "adepts" who are charged with preventing the potentially destructive power of alchemy from being released as it was in the past. Players navigate these characters through the game's fictional world by defeating enemies, solving puzzles and completing assigned missions to complete a pre-ordained storyline.

The original two games, Golden Sun and Golden Sun: The Lost Age, were released in 2001 and 2002, respectively, for the Game Boy Advance platform. A third game, Golden Sun: Dark Dawn, was released for the Nintendo DS platform in 2010. In Golden Sun, the player plays as protagonist Isaac and his companions as they set off into the world of Weyard to prevent a group of anti-heroes from releasing a mysterious power called "Alchemy" to the world. Golden Sun: The Lost Age follows the plight of the surviving members from the previous game's antagonists as they continue to pursue the release of Alchemy by means of lighting four elemental lighthouses. Golden Sun: Dark Dawn takes place thirty years later and follows the path of the descendants of the previous two games' heroes as they navigate a world adapting to the presence of Alchemy.

The series has received a generally favorable reception by critics. The first Golden Sun game has been widely lauded as among the best games for the Game Boy Advance, with the first game receiving Nintendo Power's Best GBA Game of 2001 and ranking in IGN's Readers Choice Top 100 games ever, as number 94. The Lost Age performed even better than its predecessor, ranking 78 on IGN's Readers Choice Top 100 games ever. Dark Dawn, while still scoring highly on Metacritic's aggregation of critic scores, was less well received. Sales figures for the first two Golden Sun games exceeded one million in the United States and Japan, a figure that Dark Dawn failed to exceed.

Common elements

Setting
Games in the Golden Sun series are set in the fictional world of Weyard, a flat and vaguely circular plane whose oceans perpetually spill off the edge of the world's entire perimeter into what seems to be an endless abyss. The first two installments, Golden Sun and The Lost Age, center around two groups of magically-attuned "adepts" who are alternately charged with achieving and preventing the release of a potentially destructive power known as Alchemy on the world. The force of Alchemy was prevalent in Weyard's ancient past, allowing for the development of great civilizations, but this eventually gave way to worldwide conflict that had subsided only with the sealing away of Alchemy. The keys to unlocking Alchemy, four magic jewels named the Elemental Stars, have been hidden within the mountain shrine, Mt. Aleph, which in turn has been guarded by the town of Vale at the mountain's base over the ages. The third installment, Dark Dawn, chronicles the events of Weyard thirty years after the return of Alchemy and the struggles the world's inhabitants face while adapting to their new reality.

Gameplay

In the Golden Sun games, players guide a cast of characters as they journey through a fantasy-themed world, interact with other characters, battle monsters, acquire increasingly powerful magic spells and equipment, and take part in a building, predefined narrative. Much of the game's time spent outside of battle takes place in dungeons, caves, and other locales, which generally require the player to find items that grant the bearer new forms of "Psynergy", or magical spells, in order to solve the puzzles integrated into their layout. To complete these puzzles, players must either push pillars to construct negotiable paths between elevated areas, climb up and rappel down cliffs or obtain a special item to progress through the story and game world. Outside of these dungeons and locales, the player must traverse through a large world map as they navigate between forests, rivers, mountain ranges, seas, and oceans.

A key element in in-game exploration is the strategic use of the extensive pool of Psynergy spells available, which can be used both for battle and for solving puzzles in the game's locales. A portion of the game's Psynergy can only be used in combat; conversely, many spells are only used in the game's overworld and non-battle scenarios. At the same time, there are Psynergy spells can be used in both situations; for example, the "Whirlwind" spell that can be used to damage enemies in battle is also used out of battle to clear away overgrown foliage that may block the player's path. The player gains more Psynergy spells as the game progresses, both through leveling up and the acquisition of special Psynergy-bestowing items, and with each "utility" Psynergy spell the party gains access to more locations and secrets hidden in the game world.

Regarding battle, Golden Sun games contain both random monster encounters, featuring randomly selected enemies, and compulsory battles involving set enemies, which advance the story. When a battle begins, a separate screen is brought up where the player's party and enemy party face-off on opposing sides. During a battle, the characters and the background rotate to give a pseudo-3D effect. Players can attack enemies directly using a variety of weapons and offensive Psynergy spells, or by summoning Djinn, powerful other-worldly entities that enhance an attached character's hit points, Psynergy points, and other statistics, as well as determining what Psynergy the character is able to perform. Djinn can be set to standby, where players forfeit stat enhancements in order to unleash a powerful one-time attack where the player summons an elemental monster to inflict damage on every enemy.

Plot

Golden Sun and The Lost Age

Three years prior to the start of the game's main story, Saturos and Menardi raid Mt. Aleph with the intent to steal the Elemental Stars, but fail to solve the riddles guarding them and are driven away by the mountain's trap, a magically generated thunderstorm and rock slide.

Three years later, Isaac, Garet, and Jenna join Kraden on his research trip to Mt. Aleph and manage to solve the shrine's puzzles and retrieve the Elemental Stars. They are ambushed by Saturos and Menardi, along with Felix, a previous resident of Vale who was kidnapped during the storms three years earlier. They kidnap Jenna and Kraden and take three of the four Elemental Stars and depart to light the four lighthouses and release Alchemy on the world. Isaac's party is joined by two other young adepts named Ivan and Mia, and together they pursue Saturos' party in a lengthy chase and journey that spans two continents, climaxing in a fierce battle that leads to Saturos and Menardi's death.

With Saturos and Menardi dead, Felix convinces Jenna and Kraden to join him on a quest to complete Saturos' original objective to activate the two remaining lighthouses that he failed to light. Joined by new companions Sheba and Piers, Felix and his party embark on an epic expedition while pursued by Isaac's party. Eventually, Felix's party is able to achieve entrance into a legendary, secluded Atlantis-like society named Lemuria far out in the ocean. When they convene with Lemuria's ancient king, Hydros, they learn about Alchemy's true nature: it is the sustenance of Weyard's very life force, and its absence over the past ages has caused the world's continents to decrease in size and parts of the world to collapse into the abyss. Armed with this new information, Felix manages to persuade Isaac and his party to join them, and together they fulfill the goal of releasing Alchemy and preventing Weyard's eventual decay.

Dark Dawn

Thirty years after Isaac and his party of adepts return the power of Alchemy to Weyard, continents have shifted, new countries have emerged, and new species have appeared. However, Psynergy Vortexes, which suck the elemental Psynergy from both the land and the power-wielding Adepts, are appearing all over Weyard. The original games' heroes' descendants – Matthew, Karis, Rief, and Tyrell – set out to solve the mystery of the vortexes, and face a world adapting to the constant presence of psynergy.

The game begins with Tyrell accidentally crashing one of Ivan's inventions, a Soarwing, so Isaac sends him out with Matthew and Karis to retrieve a feather of the mountain roc to build a new one. After meeting up with Kraden, Rief, and Nowell, they are ambushed by villains Blados, Chalis, and Arcanus and the party is separated. As Matthew's party travels across Weyard to reunite with Kraden and Nowell, they encounter a deadly eclipse heralded by the lighting of Luna Tower, causing suffering and destruction across the world. They manage to activate an ancient machine known as the Apollo's Lens to end the eclipse, and return home to discover a large Psynergy Vortex sitting ominously near their home.

Development

Conception

The Golden Sun games were created by the Takahashi Brothers, consisting of Hiroyuki Takahashi and Shugo Takahashi, and produced by Camelot Software Planning. According to co-creator Shugo Takahashi, the series was conceived as a way for Nintendo to compete against Sony's PlayStation console, which dominated the role-playing game market at the time. As a handheld title, Golden Sun was originally planned as a single game, but due to both the hardware limitations of putting the entire game on a single Game Boy Advance cartridge and the developers' own desire for what they wanted to do with the game, it was expanded to become two successive games, Golden Sun and Golden Sun: The Lost Age. The Takahashi Brothers had previously designed Shining Force III, where the story involved playing through the perspectives of both the "good" side and the "bad" side of the characters. Thinking that it was an effective way of conveying the full story of a fictional game world, they incorporated elements of this storytelling methodology into the two-game setup of the Golden Sun series, having the player control the "good guys" in Golden Sun and members of the antagonistic party in The Lost Age.

History
Originally, Camelot planned to create a single title instead of a series, and in the extremely early stages of their project they had created a game design document for the one Golden Sun game to be on the Nintendo 64 console. When it became apparent the N64 was to be superseded by the GameCube, Camelot shifted their focus to making a game on the handheld Game Boy Advance.

Golden Sun games generally have longer development cycles than their peer games on similar consoles due to the series' complex gameplay mechanisms and storylines. Golden Sun, the first game in the series, underwent a development cycle of between twelve and eighteen months by Camelot Software Planning, which is considered a long period of time for the development of a handheld video game, and was described as a "testament" to the positive results a long development cycle can bring to a game. It was shown in early, playable form at the Nintendo Space World Expo in Japan in August 2000. North American previewers received the game a few weeks before the release, and IGN noted that the experience of developing Shining Force for Sega helped Camelot develop a gripping RPG for the handheld.

The Lost Age was first revealed to Japan in early 2002, with the magazine Famitsu being the first publication to review the game. The Lost Age was highly anticipated; it topped IGN's list of Game Boy Advance "Most Wanted" games for 2003. The North American version of the game was playable at Electronic Entertainment Expo 2002, and IGN noted that the opening of the game did away with the slow opening sequence of Golden Sun, introducing the characters in between the action. GameSpot previewed a localized copy of The Lost Age in February 2003, and noted that the game built on its predecessor's graphics engine, with "the environments in the game featuring rich detail with little touches— such as birds that fly off as you approach."

Golden Sun: Dark Dawn was first revealed and introduced at the Nintendo E3 2009 conference by Nintendo of America president, Reggie Fils-Aime, as a series that "went dark six years ago" but has since been revisited and polished up for the Nintendo DS. The game received a larger development team than previous installments, giving the team luxuries such as visiting UNESCO World Heritage Sites for inspiration.

In an interview with Nintendo Gamer in June 2012, series producer Hiroyuki Takahashi spoke about the possibility of a fourth Golden Sun game; "A big reason for us making RPGs comes from the requests from all the people who have enjoyed our RPGs in the past. Perhaps if there are enough Nintendo users asking for another game in the Golden Sun series, then this will naturally lead to the development of such a game."

Music
The series' original music was composed by Motoi Sakuraba, and his score for the first game in his series was his first attempt at composing music for the Game Boy Advance. The new technology offered by the console encouraged Sakuraba to attempt new styles, resulting in subtle rock influences in the series' music  The collection of orchestral pieces that Sakuraba contributed to the series include an overworld theme, several battle themes that play during fight sequences, and a variety of individual themes for the games' various towns and other locales. Sakuraba returned to score both The Lost Age and Dark Dawn, with the latter released on a new platform with updated hardware. According to Sakuraba, the "sound design" for Dark Dawn was different and he preferred the music in the first two games. He has also expressed a desire for an official soundtrack release of the series' music.

Sakuraba also contributed songs to two games in the Super Smash Bros. franchise, among which two were adapted from his works in The Lost Age and Dark Dawn.

In other media
Elements from the Golden Sun games have made appearances in other media. Isaac, the main protagonist of the original Golden Sun game, is an unlockable "Assist Trophy" character in the Nintendo fighting game Super Smash Bros. Brawl. When he is summoned during battle by an Assist Trophy item, Isaac uses Psynergy to conjure a large hand three times in succession to shove the player's opponents off the stage. Should enemies attempt to evade, Isaac will turn in sync to attack a selected opponent. In addition, a medley of music from The Lost Age was selected to be on Brawl'''s soundtrack. The game's sequel,  Super Smash Bros. for Nintendo 3DS and Wii U, did not feature Isaac but The Lost Age medley was featured along with the world map theme from Dark Dawn.  However, Super Smash Bros. Ultimate marks Isaac's return to the series as an Assist Trophy, where he now is able to use more advanced tactics in battle and can now be fought, and a costume inspired by him for the Mii Swordfighter was developed. The game also features characters from all 3 titles as spirits including the adult Isaac from Dark Dawn. Despite his absence as a playable character currently in the game, he is generally ranked as one of the most requested characters in Smash's history.

The characters from the first Golden Sun game also appear in a self-published doujinshi manga titled "Golden Sun 4-Koma Gag Battle", drawn by various artists and published by Kobunsha. It was released four months after the first game came out and is not officially sanctioned by Camelot. As a result, the manga was only released in Japan.

 Reception 

The original game sold 740,000 copies in the United States and 338,000 in Japan, while The Lost Age sold 437,000 and 249,000 units in the United States and Japan, respectively. In total, both games sold 1.65 million and 1.12 million respectively, with European sales contributing 572,000 and 434,000. By the end of 2012, two years after its release, Dark Dawn only sold 80,000 units in Japan.

The series was met with many positive reviews. Reviewers praised the series' vibrant graphics, high-quality sound, and varied, refined RPG gameplay, with particular optimism on the Djinn-based gameplay system and Battle aspect despite the fact that the original two games were limited to the 32-bit cartridge. GamePro raved that Golden Sun was "A huge, fantastic, creative, and wickedly fun RPG that doesn't seem to care that it's 'just' on a GBA," while they praised that The Lost Age's eye-popping magic effects are beautiful even by console standards. IGN, meanwhile, praised the plot's intricate structure, saying that it "has been so tightly integrated into every ounce of the adventure... such a rich and deep plot that it's almost easy to get lost if you're not paying attention." 1UP praised Dark Dawn as being a huge step forward in terms of pacing and graphics compared to the previous games.

Critics complained that the combat system lacked "smart" combat; if an enemy is killed before other party members attack it, those members switch to defense instead of intelligently attacking the remaining enemies. They also took issue to the long opening sequences in both games that "alienated new players" and "confused them by swamping them with new characters". In addition, some faulted Golden Sun for still relying on the traditional "wander around, get into a random battle, win battle, wander around, random battle, etc." theme evident in many role-playing games. 1UP faulted Camelot for being unwilling to "trim its fat", and noted that all three games in the series "tend to ramble on anytime dialogue boxes start to show up. Its heroes and villains have an uncanny knack for saying incredibly simple things with about three or four times the words they actually need to convey those ideas." Game Informer noted that the difficulty of Dark Dawn was greatly dumbed down compared to previous installments and complained that "characters level up at blazing speeds" while the djinn make "even the longest boss battles a cakewalk."

In 2001, Golden Sun won the Nintendo Power Award for best Game Boy Advance game of the year. Golden Sun was ranked 94 and The Lost Age was ranked 78 on IGN's Readers Choice Top 100 games ever. In 2007, Golden Sun'' was named 24th best Game Boy Advance game of all time in IGN's feature reflecting on the Game Boy Advance's long lifespan, and its Game of the Month for April 2003 due to its "amazing graphics and sound presentation, as well as a quest that lasts for more than thirty hours."

See also
 List of best-selling Japanese role-playing game franchises

Notes

References

External links
The official Nintendo Golden Sun website 
The official Camelot Golden Sun website 
The official Camelot Golden Sun: The Lost Age site 
The official Nintendo Japan Golden Sun: Dark Dawn site 

Golden Joystick Award winners
 
Nintendo franchises
Role-playing video games
Video game franchises
Video game franchises introduced in 2001